Itamar Einhorn (born 20 September 1997) is an Israeli cyclist, who currently rides for UCI WorldTeam .

Career
In the 2020 edition of Tour Colombia Einhorn finished 3rd on stage 2 becoming the first Israeli to finish on the podium in a UCI sanctioned race.  In the 2021 edition of the Okolo Slovenska Einhorn won stage 4 becoming the first Israeli to ever win a UCI Europe Tour stage.

Major results
2014
 National Junior Road Championships
1st  Time trial
3rd Road race
2017
 2nd Road race, National Road Championships
2020
 3rd Overall Course de Solidarność et des Champions Olympiques
1st Stage 1
 9th Scheldeprijs
2021
 1st Visegrad 4 Bicycle Race – GP Polski
 1st Stage 4 Okolo Slovenska
 3rd Road race, National Road Championships
2022
 1st  Road race, National Road Championships
 1st Grand Prix Wyszków
 4th Münsterland Giro
 9th Grand Prix Nasielsk-Serock
2023
 4th Milano–Torino

Grand Tour general classification results timeline

References

External links

1997 births
Living people
Israeli male cyclists
European Games competitors for Israel
Cyclists at the 2019 European Games
Sportspeople from Modi'in-Maccabim-Re'ut